Ellensmere High School earlier known as 'Yonda fields", is a privately owned secondary boarding school in a rural Zambian province. (Muchonchi, Kabwe). The school is owned by an affluent family whose family immigrated to Zambia during and after the colonial years (1964 and beyond).

Cambridge schools in Zambia
Boarding schools in Zambia
Educational institutions with year of establishment missing
Secondary schools in Zambia
Kabwe